Jaal is a 1967 Hindi suspense-thriller film directed by Moni Bhattacharjee. The film stars Biswajeet and Mala Sinha in lead roles.

Plot
Inspector Shankar is assigned to investigate the mysterious death of Sunder Singh, whose ship wrecks on a stormy night. Sunder was off to marry Sheila, the daughter of his mother's childhood friend who had long since died. Sheila was raised by her father, who dies of a heart attack when he learns of Sunder's death. Sunder's mother decides to take Sheila to live with her. In denial of her son's death, Sunder's mother keeps doing various acts in madness. She keeps serving food for Sunder, talks with his photos, and keeps feeling that her son has returned. Meanwhile, Shankar and Sheila fall in love. But in her madness, Sunder's mother starts preparations of Sunder's wedding with Sheila. Sunder's face-burnt body is found and the mystery continues whether his death was an accident or a murder.

Cast
 Biswajeet as Inspector Shankar 
 Mala Sinha as Sheela 
 Sujit Kumar as Sundar Singh 
 Nirupa Roy as Sundar's Mother
 Johnny Walker as Prakash
 Helen Prakash's girlfriend  
 Asit Sen as Helen's uncle   
 Tarun Bose as Micheal 
 Jagdish Raj as Police sub-inspector
 Niranjan Sharma as Sheela's Father

Music
The music is composed by Laxmikant-Pyarelal, and the songs are written by Raja Mehdi Ali Khan and Anand Bakshi.

References

External links 
 

1967 films
1960s Hindi-language films
Films scored by Laxmikant–Pyarelal
Films directed by Moni Bhattacharjee
Indian thriller drama films